The Château d'Artias is a castle in Retournac in the Haute-Loire département of France.

See also
List of castles in France

Sources
 Retournac town website: Château d'Artias 

Castles in Auvergne-Rhône-Alpes
Châteaux in Haute-Loire